Francis Dodd may refer to:

Francis Dodd (artist) (1874–1949), Welsh painter and draftsman
Francis Dodd (general) (1899–1973), U.S. Army brigadier general who was interned by North Korean prisoners

See also
Frank Dodd (disambiguation)
Francis Dodds (disambiguation)
Dodd (surname)